Jonathan David (born 2000) is a Canadian soccer player.

Jonathan David may also refer to:
Jonathan David (singer) (born 1978), American musician
Jonathan David (song), 2001 song by Belle and Sebastian
Yonasan David, Haredi rosh yeshiva.

See also
David and Jonathan, heroic figures of ancient Israel
Jonathan David Brown (1955–2016), American record producer and audio engineer
Jonathan David Gómez (born 1989), Argentine footballer
Jonathan David Katz (born 1958), American activist, art historian, educator and writer
Jonathan David Victor (born 1954), American neuroscientist